Gaspar Méndez de Haro, 7th Marquess of Carpio or Gaspar Méndez de Haro y Fernández de Córdoba, (1 June 1629 – 16 November 1687), 3 times a Grandee of Spain including the Carpio Marquisate since 10 May 1640 by king Philip IV of Spain, Governor of Flanders,  Ambassador in Rome, 1677–1682, Viceroy of Naples, 1683 - died in office there in  1687, 2nd Duke of Montoro since November 1661, and many other high nobility titles, was a Spanish political figure and art collector.

In full).

The family background of Don Gaspar, the 7th Marquis of Carpio and 2nd Duke of Montoro

He was the first son of powerful valido of Spain Luis de Haro, a.k.a. Luis Méndez de Haro y Guzman, a.k.a. Luis de Haro y Guzmán, 6th marquis of Carpio, 1st Duke of Montoro since 12 April 1660, Great Commander of the military Order of Alcántara. His mother was Catalina Fernández de Córdoba y Aragón, the youngest daughter of Enrique Fernández de Córdoba Cardona y Aragón, a Grandee of Spain, 5th Duke of  Segorbe, 6th Duke of Cardona, 4th Marquis of Comares, 6th Marquis of Pallars, 36th Count of Ampurias, 11th Count of Prades and many other lesser titles, and Catalina Fernández de Córdoba y Figueroa.

The Carpio Marquisate was a title first awarded by King Philip II of Spain, to his ancestor Luis Méndez de Haro y Sotomayor, 1st Marquis of Carpio on 20 October 1559.

Coat of Arms of the Basque "de Haro" family, as well as the Galician "de Sotomayor" branch connected to the lords of, and later, Marquisses of, since 1559, of Carpio, province of Córdoba. Sometimes, the Marquess title, 2nd and 4th, had been transmitted by the family females and inheritors under the jure uxoris principle to other "de Haro" untitled males, their male sons from such marriages carrying thus the title forwards through the new male line. The two wolves eating lambs are typical Basque-Navarre lore, the St. Andrews golden crosses indicating their pertinence to the Basque-Navarrese families intervening in the conquests of Úbeda and Baeza, Province of Jaén, during the first third of the 13th century.

Gaspar Méndez de Haro, (1629–1687), as a politician

His father Luis Mendez de Haro had succeeded his uncle, Gaspar de Guzmán y Pimentel, Count-Duke of Olivares as Valido of Spain.
Gaspar had the ambition to follow in his father's footsteps, but was frustrated in his ambitions. He was then suspected to be behind a plan to kill the King by blowing up the Buen Retiro Palace. As a punishment, he was sent to Portugal to fight the insurgents, where he was made prisoner after the defeat at Montes Claros. In 1677, he was rehabilitated and sent to Rome as ambassador, until July 1682. He then became Viceroy of Naples, then a Spanish possession, until his death in 1687.

Gaspar Méndez de Haro, (1629–1687), as an art collector

Gaspar Mendez de Haro was a renowned art collector. During his stay in Rome his agent, Antonio Saurer negotiated in Venice the acquisition of important works of art. When he died in 1687, he had a collection of an estimated 3000 paintings, 1200 in Spain and the rest in Naples. 
In this collection were :
 the Rokeby Venus by Diego Velázquez
 the Magdalene by Titian
 several paintings by Tintoretto
 Christ Crowned with Thorns by Antonello da Messina (now in the Metropolitan Museum of Art)

He also engaged Bernini to make a copy of his famous fountain on the Piazza Navona in Rome,  to be placed in Naples.

Some paintings from his collection

The succession to the titles
He first married Antonia de la Cerda Enríquez de Ribera y Portocarrero, deceased January 1670,  daughter of Antonio de la Cerda, 7th Duke of Medinaceli; and after her death he married on 11 June 1671  Teresa Enriquez de Cabrera, deceased 1716.

She was the daughter of Juan Gaspar Enríquez de Cabrera, 6th Duke of Medina de Río Seco, 10th Admiral of Castile, 10th Count of Melgar, 10th Count of Rueda, Count of Modica and a Grandee of Spain, (* Madrid, Spain, 1625 – Madrid, Spain, 15 September 1691).

They had one daughter, Catalina de Haro, 8th Marchioness  of Carpio, 5th duchess of Olivares, who later married Francisco Álvarez de Toledo, 10th Duke of Alba, taking much of his art collection into the Alba collection.

Gaspar de Haro is buried in the pantheon of the Count-Dukes of San Lúcar and Olivares at Loeches near Madrid.

Gaspar's second wife Teresa Enríquez de Cabrera y Alvarez de Toledo, a widow since 1687, married again on 20 June 1688 Joaquín Ponce de León Lencastre, 7th Duke of Arcos, 7th Duke since 1693, deceased 1729,  Duke of Torres Novaes, but there was no issue from this marriage.

Sources

El Marqués del Carpio

 Beatrice Cacciotti, 'La collezione del VII marchese del Carpio tra Roma e Madrid', in: Boletino d'Arte 86-87 (1994), pp. 133–196. (On Haro y Guzman's art collection)

1628 births
1687 deaths
Viceroys of Naples
Marquesses of Spain
Dukes of Olivares
Counts of Olivares
Dukes of Montoro
Spanish politicians
Spanish art collectors
Gaspar Mendez
Grandees of Spain
Marquesses of Carpio